Affif is both a surname and a given name. Notable people with the name include:

Ron Affif (born 1965), American jazz guitarist
Affif Ben Badra (born 1960), French actor and stuntman